The Caspian Flotilla is a naval force of Russia, with a lineage going back to 1722, it may also refer to:

Astrakhan-Caspian Military Flotilla, Bolshevik force on the Volga and Northern Caspian during the Russian Civil War
British Caspian Flotilla, a British Royal Navy force established in 1918 during the foreign intervention in the Russian Civil War
Caspian Flotilla of White Movement, a White Movement naval force of the Russian Civil War

See also
Azerbaijani Navy
Islamic Republic of Iran Navy
Kazakhstan Naval Force
Turkmenistan Naval Force